|}

The Lanzarote Hurdle is a National Hunt hurdle race in Great Britain which is open to horses aged four years or older. It is run at Kempton Park over a distance of about 2 miles and 5 furlongs (4,225 metres), and during its running there are ten hurdles to be jumped. It is a handicap race, and it is scheduled to take place each year in January.

The event is named in memory of the racehorse Lanzarote (1968–1977), the winner of the Champion Hurdle in 1974, and was first run in 1978. 
Lanzarote had a particularly good record in races at Kempton, and he twice won the track's leading hurdle event, the Christmas Hurdle. He finished his hurdling career with a total of 20 wins from 33 starts. After achieving a further three victories as a chaser, Lanzarote was made the second favourite to win the Cheltenham Gold Cup in 1977. However, during that race he broke his near-hind leg and had to be euthanised.

For many years the distance of the Lanzarote Hurdle was set at 2 miles (3,219 metres), and there were eight hurdles to be jumped. The event was temporarily switched to Carlisle in 2006, and upon its return to Kempton in 2007 there was a substantial increase to its distance. Its regular length was extended by 5 furlongs (1,006 metres), and there were an additional two hurdles to jump. In its analysis of that year's running, the Racing Post commented that this was: "In effect, a new race. Although run under the 'Lanzarote' handle, this was in no way the same race as the Lanzarote of old." Prior to 2023 the race had Listed status. This was removed when Listed handicap races were removed from the racing programme, and the race became a Class 2 handicap.

Winners
 Weights given in stones and pounds.

See also
 Horse racing in Great Britain
 List of British National Hunt races

References

 Racing Post:

 britishhorseracing.com – "The Lanzarote story".

External links
 Race Recordings 

National Hunt races in Great Britain
Kempton Park Racecourse
National Hunt hurdle races